The Liga de Basket de Lima (LBL) is a regional basketball league in Peru. It is contested between teams from Lima. It is held since 1997.

Until 2011, it was the most important basketball championship in Peru. Since 2011, the annual winners of this league qualify for Peru's National Basketball League.

Current clubs

Champions

References

External links
Facebook Presentation
Peruvian basketball at LatinBasket.com

Basketball competitions in Peru
Peru